The Battle of Formigny, fought on 15 April 1450, was a major battle of the Hundred Years' War between the kingdom of England and the kingdom of France. The destruction of England's last army in Normandy in the battle and the decisive French victory paved the way for the capture of the remaining English strongholds in Normandy.

Background
The French, under Charles VII, had taken the time offered by the Treaty of Tours in 1444 to reorganize and reinvigorate their armies. The English, without clear leadership from the weak Henry VI, were scattered and dangerously weak. When the French broke the truce in June 1449 they were in a much improved position. Pont-Audemer, Pont-L'Evêque and Lisieux fell in August and much of Normandy was retaken by October. Cutting north and east the Bureau brothers oversaw the capture of Rouen (October 1449), Harfleur (December 1449), Honfleur and Fresnoy (January 1450), before moving on to invade Caen.

The English had gathered a small army during the winter of 1449. Numbering around 3,400 men, it was dispatched from Portsmouth to Cherbourg under the command of Sir Thomas Kyriell. Upon landing on 15 March 1450, Kyriell's army was reinforced by Edmund Beaufort, Duke of Somerset and lieutenant general of Normandy with forces drawn from Norman garrisons under Sir Matthew Gough (Bayeux), Sir Robert de Vere (Caen) and Sir Henry Norbury (Vire).

Battle
Kyriell advanced south, laying siege to Valognes, which blocked Cherbourg from the rest of the Cotentin peninsula. Valognes fell on 27 March after a short siege and Kyriell continued his advance toward French-held Carentan.

When the English army circled Carentan on 12 April, the French declined to sally although there were a number of smaller skirmishes. Kyriell turned east towards Bayeux, reaching the village of Formigny on 14 April. A French army of 3,000 men under Jean de Bourbon, who was also Comte de Clermont, advanced east from Carentan to intercept the English force. On the same day a force of 1,200–2,000 Breton cavalry, under Arthur de Richemont, had reached Saint-Lô from the south.

On 15 April, Clermont's forces were sighted by the English. The armies faced each other on the Carentan-Bayeux road, near a small tributary of the Aure, the English with their backs to the stream. The English formation was 4,000–7,000 strong and gathered in a long line behind a thicket of stakes and low earthworks.

In the afternoon, the French opened the engagement with a failed assault on the English position with their dismounted men-at-arms.  French cavalry charges on the English flanks were also defeated.  Clermont then deployed two culverins to open fire on the English defenders. Unable to withstand the fire, the English attacked in an attempt to capture the guns. 

At this moment the Breton cavalry force under Richemont arrived from the south, having crossed the Aure and approached the English force from the flank. Clermont's forces were encouraged by the presence of Pierre de Brézé and stood their ground despite being outnumbered more than twice.

As his men were scrambling to capture French guns, Kyriell shifted forces to the left to face the new threat. Clermont responded by pressing the attack. Having abandoned their prepared position, the English force was charged upon by Richemont's Breton cavalry, then enveloped by Clermont and Brézé's French troops, and massacred from both sides, with Kyriell taken prisoner. A small force under Sir Matthew Gough was able to escape.

As contemporary chronicles suggest, after the battle, the French infantrymen, despite the knights' protestation, massacred about 500 Welsh archers who were pleading for mercy as their lord, Sir Matthew Gough had abandoned them to escape with his retinue to Bayeux.The English corpses were piled up and buried at the nearby field, later dubbed "The Englishmen Tomb"..

Aftermath

Kyriell's army had ceased to exist, with 3,754 killed and 1,200–1,400 taken prisoner, while French and Breton casualties were estimated as "probably less than a thousand" or "about 500 men". As all the other significant English forces in Normandy were wiped out before the battle, the whole region quickly fell to the victorious French. Caen was captured on 12 June and Cherbourg, the last English-held fortress in Normandy, fell on 12 August.

The battle is often cited as the first in which cannons played a pivotal role (the first decisive use of cannon is generally considered to have been the following battle, at Castillon). This is rather difficult to judge; contemporary accounts are dubious and it can be seen that the arrival of the Breton army of Arthur de Richemont, future duke of Brittany,  Arthur III, with his powerful force of cavalry on the flank of the English, forcing them to leave their prepared defensive position, was more significant, although the early artillery fire from the two French guns played a role in that as well.

The cannon may have been decisive, not so much for the effect they had themselves, but in that they alerted Richemont to the fact that there was a battle going on, and so caused his appearance on the field. It was fortunate for Clermont that this was so because one of his captains wrote shortly afterwards that if the Constable (Richemont) had not come when he did, Clermont's army would have suffered "irreparable damage" due to the English numerical superiority.

Images

Notes

References

Sources

.

1450 in England
1450s in France
Formigny 1450
Calvados (department)
Formigny
Formigny
Hundred Years' War, 1415–1453